Lucille "Lucy" Charuk (born 13 August 1989) is a Canadian volleyball player. She is a member of the Canada women's national volleyball team and plays for Calcit Volley since 2018. She was part of the Canadian national team at the 2014 FIVB Volleyball Women's World Championship in Italy.

Charuk attended the University of Houston.

Awards

Individuals
 2015 NORCECA Championship "Best Middle Blocker"

References

1989 births
Living people
Place of birth missing (living people)
Volleyball players at the 2015 Pan American Games
Pan American Games competitors for Canada
People from Delta, British Columbia
Sportspeople from British Columbia
Canadian women's volleyball players
Middle blockers
Expatriate volleyball players in the United States
Expatriate volleyball players in Slovenia
Expatriate volleyball players in Germany
Expatriate volleyball players in Romania
Canadian expatriate sportspeople in the United States
Canadian expatriate sportspeople in Croatia
Canadian expatriate sportspeople in Slovenia
Canadian expatriate sportspeople in Germany
Canadian expatriate sportspeople in Romania
Houston Cougars women's volleyball players
University of Houston alumni